Anna Hernandez is an American politician. Hernandez was elected in 2022 to serve in the Arizona State Senate representing District 24 as a member of the Democratic Party, defeating incumbent State Representative Cesar Chavez in the Democratic primary. Hernandez went on to be unopposed in the general election.

References

Year of birth missing (living people)
Living people
Democratic Party Arizona state senators
21st-century American politicians